= Joshua Landy =

English professor

Joshua Landy is the Andrew B. Hammond Professor in French Language, Literature and Civilization at Stanford University. He is also a Professor of Comparative Literature and co-director of the Literature and Philosophy Initiative at Stanford.

== Education ==
Landy received his BA (in French and German) from Churchill College, Cambridge in 1988; his M.A. from Cambridge University in 1991; and his Ph.D. (in Comparative Literature) from Princeton University in 1997, with a thesis "The cruel gift: lucid self-delusion in French literature and German philosophy, 1851-1914"

== Work ==
Landy is the author of Philosophy as Fiction: Self, Deception, and Knowledge in Proust (Oxford University Press, 2004) and How To Do Things with Fictions (Oxford University Press, June 2012). He is the co-editor of two volumes, Thematics: New Approaches (SUNY, 1995, with Claude Bremond and Thomas Pavel) and The Re-Enchantment of the World: Secular Magic in a Rational Age (Stanford, 2009, with Michael Saler). Philosophy as Fiction deals with issues of self-knowledge, self-deception, and self-fashioning in Marcel Proust's A la recherche du temps perdu, while raising the question of what literary form contributes to an engagement with such questions; How to Do Things with Fictions discusses a series of texts (by Plato, Beckett, Mallarmé, and Mark) that function as training-grounds for the mental capacities.

Landy has appeared on the NPR shows "Forum" and "Philosophy Talk" and has on various occasions been guest host of "Entitled Opinions."

Landy received Stanford's Walter J. Gores Award for Teaching Excellence in 1999 and Dean's Award for Distinguished Teaching in 2001. In 2012 he was included in Princeton Review's "Best 300 Professors".

== Books ==
- How to do Things With Fictions. Oxford University Press, 2012. ISBN 9780195188561. According to WorldCat, the book is held in 322 libraries
- The Re-Enchantment of the World: Secular Magic in a Rational Age, ed. Joshua Landy and Michael Saler. Stanford University Press, 2009. ISBN 9780804752992 According to WorldCat, the book is held in 274 libraries
- Philosophy As Fiction: Self, Deception, and Knowledge in Proust. Oxford University Press, 2004. ISBN 9780195169393. According to WorldCat, the book is held in 485 libraries
- Thematics: New Approaches ed. Claude Bremond, Joshua Landy, and Thomas G. Pavel. State University of New York Press, 1995.
